Reece McGinley (born 1 March 2000) is a former Northern Irish footballer who last played for NIFL Premiership side Crusaders.

Career
After graduating from the academy, McGinley signed professionally for Rotherham United in April 2018. He had previously made his competitive debut for the club, coming on as a late substitute in a 3–0 win away at Bradford City in the EFL Trophy in November 2017.

On 2 January 2019, McGinley was loaned out to NIFL Premiership side Crusaders FC on a loan deal for the rest of the season.

At the end of the 2018–19 season, McGinley was released by Rotherham United after his contract expired. He returned to Crusaders for the new season, and in December 2019 signed a two-year contract.

McGinley left Crusaders by mutual consent in April 2021, to focus on his personal training business.

International career
He has represented Northern Ireland at under 15s, 17s and 19s level.

Career statistics

Honours
Crusaders
Irish Cup: 2018–19

References

External links

Profile on Crusaders FC

2000 births
Living people
Association footballers from Northern Ireland
Rotherham United F.C. players
Frickley Athletic F.C. players
Association football midfielders
Crusaders F.C. players